Christine Elizabeth Wormuth (born April 19, 1969) is an American defense official and career civil servant who  serves as the United States Secretary of the Army since 2021. Wormuth previously served as the Under Secretary of Defense for Policy from 2014 to 2016.

Early life and education
Christine Elizabeth Wormuth was born on April 19, 1969 in the community of La Jolla, north of San Diego. After growing up in College Station, Texas, she graduated from Williams College in Massachusetts with a bachelor's degree in political science before earning her master's in public policy from the University of Maryland.

Career
Wormuth entered government service as a presidential management intern in 1995. She spent the next six and half years as a civil servant in the Defense Department. Later, she worked as a government consultant and then a senior fellow at the Center for Strategic and International Studies.

Before she was nominated Under Secretary of Defense for Policy, Wormuth served in the National Security Council as the Special Assistant to the President and the Defense Policy and Strategy Senior Director. From 2009 to 2010, Wormuth was the Principal Deputy Assistant Secretary for Homeland Defense.

Obama administration
Wormuth was nominated by President Barack Obama to serve as the Under Secretary of Defense for Policy. On June 19, 2014, she was confirmed by the United States Senate by voice vote. As the Under Secretary, Wormuth contributed to counter-terrorism operations and engaged in defense relations with Europe, Asia, and the Middle East.

Upon the conclusion of her tenure as the Under Secretary, Wormuth was appointed as the Director of the RAND International Security and Defense Policy Center.

Biden administration

In November 2020, Wormuth was named a volunteer member of the Joe Biden presidential transition Agency Review Team to support transition efforts related to the United States Department of Defense.

Secretary of the Army
On April 12, 2021, President Joe Biden nominated Wormuth to serve as the 25th Secretary of the Army. She is the first woman to serve in the position for the Army, however, not the first female Secretary in the United States Armed Forces, as there have been several female Secretaries of the Air Force. On April 15, 2021, her nomination was sent to the Senate. On May 24, her nomination was reported out of the Senate Armed Services Committee by voice vote. Two days later, her nomination was confirmed by the Senate by unanimous consent, but Senate majority leader Chuck Schumer requested it be rescinded and her confirmation was subsequently reversed hours later. This was because Republican Senator Kevin Cramer had placed a hold on her nomination to resolve an issue involving an underpaid Army major and the Senate had mistakenly approved her nomination before he had removed his hold. The following day, Cramer removed his hold after being told the pay issue would be resolved and confirmed that he supported Wormuth, who he said would "do a fine job". Wormuth was then officially confirmed on May 27, again by unanimous consent. She was sworn in the following day.

Personal life
Secretary Wormuth is married to a part-time reservist with the Navy and has two daughters.

References

External links

 

|-

1969 births
Living people
People from La Jolla, San Diego
People from College Station, Texas
Obama administration personnel
Biden administration personnel
United States Under Secretaries of Defense
United States Secretaries of the Army
University System of Maryland alumni
Williams College alumni